Robert B. Hargraves (August 11, 1928 – March 21, 2003) was an American geologist who worked as a professor at Princeton University.

Career
Hargraves was born in Durban, South Africa. He started in his career as mining geologist in 1948, after receiving his BS from Natal University. In 1952, he emigrated to the United States, and after service in the United States Army he went to graduate school at Princeton. After completion of his Ph.D. in 1959, he first worked at University of the Witwatersrand and then at Princeton.

Achievements
Hargraves was a specialists in rock magnetism and petrology. In his career he discovered many impact features on Earth by studying the effects of the impact event on the local rock strata. He was actively involved in the study of rocks from the Moon, returned to Earth by the Apollo missions. He also worked on the Viking program and Pathfinder mission to the planet Mars.

Honors
A crater on Mars is named in his honor.

References

1928 births
2003 deaths
20th-century American geologists
Princeton University faculty
University of Natal alumni
Princeton University alumni
South African emigrants to the United States